Sportske novosti is a Croatian daily sports newspaper based in Zagreb.

It was established on 9 August 1945 as Ilustrirane fiskulturne novine weekly newspaper. Several months later, on 10 December 1945, its name got changed to Narodni sport. From March 1949, its publishing frequency increased to twice a week, and from 1951 to three times per week.

In 1962 it was acquired by the Vjesnik publishing company. Its name was changed to Sportske novosti on 1 March 1962 and from then on it was published five times per week. Since 1967 it was published six times per week (every day except on Sundays). From 1974 to 1987 it had a circulation of 100,000 copies which turned Sportske novosti into the most popular sports newspaper in Yugoslavia.

In 1952 it established the annual Sportsman of the Year (Sportaš godine) and Sportswoman of the Year (Sportašica godine) awards for notable achievements in Yugoslav sports, selected by the jury of sports journalists from around the country. In 1990 it also began presenting awards for Men's Sports Team of the Year (Momčad godine) and Women's Sports Team of the Year (Ekipa godine) for notable achievements in Croatian team sports. 

In 1999 it was acquired by Europapress Holding publishing company and since 2001 it is regularly published on Sundays. Later that year the Sportske novosti Footballer of the Year award for the best football player in the world as voted by some of the world's top coaches and players was established. On 30 December 2005 Zvonimir Boban was appointed CEO of Sportske novosti who later announced that the newspaper would in the future give more attention to football-related news. Boban resigned from his position in December 2008 due to his long-standing dissatisfaction with the editorial board.

In 2013, along the Croatian football syndicate established Football Oscar awards, chosen by Croatian footballers and coaches. The chosen categories are Croatian Footballer of the Year, HNL Footballer of the Year, HNL Young Footballer of the Year, HNL Goalkeeper of the Year, HNL Referee of the Year, HNL Coach of the Year, HNL Team of the Year, and Fairplay Team of the Year.

See also
Sportske novosti awards (For highest achievements in Croatian men's, women's and team sports)
Sportske novosti Yellow Shirt award (For the Prva HNL footballer of the year)
Sportske Novosti World Footballer of the Year award (For the best world footballer of the year)

References

External links
Official website 

Sports newspapers
Newspapers established in 1945
Daily newspapers published in Croatia
Sports mass media in Croatia
Croatian-language newspapers
Sport in Croatia
Mass media in Zagreb
Newspapers published in Yugoslavia